John Robert Horner (born June 15, 1946) is an American paleontologist most famous for describing Maiasaura, providing the first clear evidence that some dinosaurs cared for their young. In addition to his paleontological discoveries, Horner served as the technical advisor for the first five Jurassic Park films, had a cameo appearance in Jurassic World, and served as a partial inspiration for one of the lead characters of the franchise, Dr. Alan Grant. Horner studied at the University of Montana, although he did not complete his degree due to undiagnosed dyslexia, and was awarded a Doctorate in Science honoris causa. He retired from Montana State University on July 1, 2016, although he claims to have been pushed out of the Museum of the Rockies after having married an undergraduate student and now teaches as a Presidential Fellow at Chapman University.

Biography 

Horner was born and raised near Shelby, Montana. He was eight years old when he found his first dinosaur bone. He attended the University of Montana for seven years, majoring in geology and zoology. He also spent two years in the U.S. Marine Corps, serving in Vietnam during the Vietnam War in a reconnaissance unit. Horner did not complete his bachelor's degree due to severe dyslexia. However, he did complete a senior thesis on the fauna of the Bear Gulch Limestone, one of the most famous Mississippian lagerstätten (exceptionally preserved fossil sites) in the world, located in Montana. The University of Montana awarded him an Honorary Doctorate of Science in 1986. Also in 1986 he was awarded the prestigious MacArthur Fellowship. In 1993, he received the Golden Plate Award of the American Academy of Achievement.

In Montana during the mid-1970s, Horner and his research partner Bob Makela discovered a colonial nesting site of a new dinosaur genus which they named Maiasaura, or "Good Mother Lizard". The dinosaur bones, originating from a juvenile, were first discovered by Marion Brandvold. Horner then studied the bones, and at first, there was a refusal to return the bones to Brandvold. It contained the first dinosaur eggs in the Western hemisphere, the first dinosaur embryos, and settled questions of whether some dinosaurs were sociable, built nests and cared for their young. The discovery established Horner's career. He has named several other species of dinosaur (including Orodromeus makelai, in memory of his late friend Bob Makela) and has had three named after himself: Achelousaurus horneri, Anasazisaurus horneri, and Daspletosaurus horneri.

Within the paleontological community, Horner is best known for his work on dinosaur growth research. He has published numerous articles in collaboration with Berkeley paleontologist Kevin Padian, and French dinosaur histologist Armand de Ricqlès, on the growth of dinosaurs using growth series. This usually involves leg bones in graduated sizes from different individuals ranging in age from embryos to adults. Horner also revitalized the contested theory that Tyrannosaurus rex was an obligate scavenger, rather than a predatory killer. While this theory has been widely discussed by the popular press, it has never been a major research focus for Horner. He claimed that he never published the scavenger hypothesis in the peer reviewed scientific literature, stating that it was mainly a tool for him to teach a popular audience, particularly children, of the dangers of making assumptions in science (such as assuming T. rex was a hunter) without using evidence. In 2000, teams led by Horner discovered five specimens of T. rex and three more the following summer, including one larger than the specimen nicknamed "Sue". The new fossil was 10–13 tons in weight and 10% larger than other specimens. The Museum of the Rockies, as the result of continuing fieldwork, now exhibits the largest Tyrannosaurus rex collection in the world. Currently, Horner is working on the developmental biology of dinosaurs.

Horner has published over 100 professional papers, eight books including Dinosaurs Under the Big Sky; a children's book, Maia: A Dinosaur Grows Up; a non-fiction book on dinosaurs from Montana, Dinosaur Lives; and numerous articles. He was also a part of a 2005 discovery of soft tissue in a T. rex fossil. Horner was the Curator of Paleontology at the Museum of the Rockies, the Regent's Professor of Paleontology, adjunct curator at the National Museum of Natural History, and taught at the Montana State University in Bozeman, Montana. Over the years he has advised people who have gone on to be leading experts in paleontology, such as Mary Higby Schweitzer, Greg Erickson, Kristi Curry-Rogers, and David J. Varricchio. Horner was awarded an honorary doctorate by Pennsylvania State University in 2006 in recognition of his work.

In 2003, Horner discovered a fossilized tyrannosaur leg bone from which paleontologist Mary Higby Schweitzer was able to retrieve proteins in 2007.

In 2009, the National Geographic released a documentary entitled "Dinosaurs Decoded", which reviews Horner's research into juvenile dinosaurs. He suggests that juvenile dinosaurs looked sufficiently different from adults, and that they have sometimes been mistaken for separate species. The program examines specific changes that occurred as dinosaurs aged and speculates on why the changes were necessary. Horner's research on the topic has gone as far as eliminating several "sub-species" of Triceratops, Pachycephalosaurus, and Tyrannosaurus. Horner also believes that if his research were to continue as much as a third of known dinosaurs would be classified under an existing species.

In Las Vegas on January 15, 2012, 65-year-old Horner married Vanessa Weaver, a 19-year-old Montana State University undergraduate paleontology student and volunteer in his lab. The couple had divorced by August 2016, but remained friends.

On November 2, 2013, Horner was awarded the Romer–Simpson Prize, the highest honor a paleontologist can receive from the Society of Vertebrate Paleontology.

On his retirement from Montana State University on July 1, 2016, the MacMillan Foundation honored Horner for his work with a $3 million endowment for the John R. Horner Curator of Paleontology Chair for the Museum of the Rockies/ Montana State University - funding the work of his Paleontology successors in perpetuity.

In popular culture, Horner is the subject of the children's book, Jack Horner, Dinosaur Hunter! written by Sophia Gholz,  illustrated by Dave Shephard, and   published by Sleeping Bear Press. The book, which has been translated into French,  chronicles the life of Horner, from a child in Montana to an adult on the set of Jurassic Park, and discusses Horner's scientific contributions as well as navigating life with a reading disability.

Build a Dinosaur Project

Horner's 2009 book, How to Build a Dinosaur: Extinction Doesn't Have to Be Forever, describes his plan to recreate a dinosaur by genetically "nudging" the DNA of a chicken. Horner's idea for the project came from an early script for the film Jurassic World.
He had been planning the book as early as June 2005; it was originally planned to be released simultaneously with Jurassic World as a scientific companion volume.

In 2011, Horner pursued the project to develop the animal, which he describes as a "chickenosaurus", with a team of geneticists. By November 2014, Horner and his team had conducted some of the earliest research into the embryonic development of tails. Such research may ultimately lead to new treatments for people with spinal disorders. Research into the mesenchyme tissue of chicken embryos, which direct the growth of teeth, may also aid in the treatment of human sarcomas. George Lucas had funded most of the project's costs up to that point, while an additional $5 million was needed. Horner expected to have a living dinosaur within 10 years.

In 2015, an independent group of scientists reported that they had found a way to turn the beaks of chicken embryos back into dinosaur-like snouts, by reverse genetic engineering, and University of Chile geneticists have produced embryos with dinosaur-like leg and foot anatomy including the fibula full-length and reaching the ankle.

References

External links
 
 http://www.hornersciencegroup.com
 http://www.jackhornersworldofdinosaurs.com 
 Museum of the Rockies
 
 "Where are the baby dinosaurs?" (TEDxVancouver 2011) (also )
 "Building a dinosaur from a chicken" (TED2011) (also )

1946 births
Living people
United States Marine Corps personnel of the Vietnam War
American paleontologists
MacArthur Fellows
People from Bozeman, Montana
People from Shelby, Montana
University of Montana alumni
Scientists with dyslexia
United States Marines